Stuart A. Fleming (9 June 1920 – 24 February 1993) was a Progressive Conservative party member of the House of Commons of Canada. He was a wholesaler by career.

He was first elected at the Okanagan—Revelstoke riding in the 1958 general election after an unsuccessful attempt to win that riding in 1957. Fleming was re-elected in 1962 and 1963. After completing his final term, the 26th Canadian Parliament, in 1965, Fleming left Parliament and did not campaign in further federal elections.

External links
 

1920 births
1993 deaths
Members of the House of Commons of Canada from British Columbia
Progressive Conservative Party of Canada MPs
People from Vernon, British Columbia